The Samsung NX 30mm F2 Pancake is an interchangeable camera lens announced by Samsung on January 4, 2010.

References
http://www.dpreview.com/products/samsung/lenses/samsung_30_2/specifications

30
Pancake lenses
Camera lenses introduced in 2010